Brendan Gleeson (born 29 March 1955) is an Irish actor and film director. He is the recipient of three IFTA Awards, two BIFA's, and a Primetime Emmy Award and has been nominated twice for a BAFTA Award, five times for a Golden Globe Award and once for an Academy Award. In 2020, he was listed at number 18 on The Irish Times list of Ireland's greatest film actors. He is the father of actors Domhnall Gleeson and Brian Gleeson.

He is best known for his performance as Alastor Moody in the Harry Potter films (2005–2010). He is also known for his supporting roles in films such as Braveheart (1995), Michael Collins (1996), 28 Days Later (2002), Gangs of New York (2002), Cold Mountain (2003), Troy (2004), Suffragette (2015), Paddington 2 (2017), The Ballad of Buster Scruggs (2018), and The Tragedy of Macbeth (2021). He is also known for his leading roles in films such as The General (1998), In Bruges (2008), The Guard (2011), Calvary (2014), Frankie (2019), and The Banshees of Inisherin (2022) for which he received a nomination for the Academy Award for Best Supporting Actor.

He won a Primetime Emmy Award in 2009 for his portrayal of Winston Churchill in the television film Into the Storm. He also received a Golden Globe Award nomination for his performance as Donald Trump in the Showtime series The Comey Rule (2020). From 2017 to 2019 he starred in the crime series Mr. Mercedes. He received an Emmy Award nomination for Stephen Frears' Sundance TV series State of the Union (2022).

Early life
Gleeson was born in Dublin, the son of Pat (1925–2007) and Frank Gleeson (1918–2010). Gleeson has described himself as having been an avid reader as a child. He received his second-level education at St Joseph's CBS in Fairview, Dublin where he was a member of the school drama group. He received his Bachelor of Arts at University College Dublin, majoring in English and Irish. After training as an actor, he worked for several years as a secondary school teacher of Irish and English at the now defunct Catholic Belcamp College in North County Dublin, which closed in 2004. He was working simultaneously as an actor while teaching, doing semi-professional and professional productions in Dublin and surrounding areas. He left the teaching profession to commit full-time to acting in 1991. In an NPR interview to promote Calvary in 2014, Gleeson stated he was molested as a child by a Christian Brother in primary school but was in "no way traumatised by the incident."

Career

As a member of the Dublin-based Passion Machine Theatre company, Gleeson appeared in several of the theatre company's early and highly successful plays such as Brownbread (1987), written by Roddy Doyle and directed by Paul Mercier, Wasters (1985) and Home (1988), written and directed by Paul Mercier. He has also written three plays for Passion Machine: The Birdtable (1987) and Breaking Up (1988), both of which he directed, and Babies and Bathwater (1994) in which he acted. Among his other Dublin theatre work are Patrick Süskind's one-man play The Double Bass and John B. Keane's The Year of the Hiker.

Gleeson started his film career at the age of 34. He first came to prominence in Ireland for his role as Michael Collins in The Treaty, a television film broadcast on RTÉ One, and for which he won a Jacob's Award in 1992. He has acted in such films as Braveheart, I Went Down, Michael Collins, Gangs of New York, Cold Mountain, 28 Days Later, Troy, Kingdom of Heaven, Lake Placid, A.I. Artificial Intelligence, Mission: Impossible 2, and The Village. He won critical acclaim for his performance as Irish gangster Martin Cahill in John Boorman's 1998 film The General.

In 2003, Gleeson was the voice of Hugh the Miller in an episode of the Channel 4 animated series Wilde Stories. While Gleeson portrayed Irish statesman Michael Collins in The Treaty, he later portrayed Collins' close collaborator Liam Tobin in the film Michael Collins with Liam Neeson taking the role of Collins. Gleeson later went on to portray Winston Churchill in Into the Storm. Gleeson won an Emmy Award for his performance.

Gleeson played Hogwarts professor Mad-Eye Moody in the fourth, fifth and seventh Harry Potter films. His son Domhnall played Bill Weasley in the seventh and eighth films.
 

Gleeson provided the voice of Abbot Cellach in The Secret of Kells, an animated film co-directed by Tomm Moore and Nora Twomey of Cartoon Saloon which premiered in February 2009 at the Jameson Dublin International Film Festival. Gleeson starred in the short film Six Shooter in 2006, which won an Academy Award for Best Live Action Short Film. This film was written and directed by Martin McDonagh. In 2008, Gleeson starred in the comedy crime film In Bruges, also written and directed by McDonagh. The film, and Gleeson's performance, enjoyed huge critical acclaim, earning Gleeson several award nominations, including his first Golden Globe nomination. In the movie, Gleeson plays a mentor-like figure for Colin Farrell's hitman. In his review of In Bruges, Roger Ebert described the elder Gleeson as having a "noble shambles of a face and the heft of a boxer gone to seed."

In July 2012, he started filming The Grand Seduction, with Taylor Kitsch, a remake of Jean-François Pouliot's French-Canadian La Grande Séduction (2003) directed by Don McKellar; the film was released in 2013. In 2016, he appeared in the video game adaptation Assassin's Creed and Ben Affleck's crime drama Live by Night. In 2017 he finished Psychic, a short he directed and starred in. In 2022, he reunited with Martin McDonagh in the tragic comedy The Banshees of Inisherin starring opposite Colin Farrell. For his performance as Colm Doherty, he has received numerous awards nominations, including the Academy Award, Golden Globe, and Critics' Choice for Best Supporting Actor.

Musical talent
Gleeson is a fiddle and mandolin player, with an interest in Irish folklore. He played the fiddle during his roles in Cold Mountain, Michael Collins, The Grand Seduction, and The Banshees of Inisherin, and also features on Altan's 2009 live album. In the Coen brothers' The Ballad of Buster Scruggs (2018), Gleeson sings "The Unfortunate Rake". He has also made a contribution in 2019 to the album by Irish folk group Dervish with a version of Rocky Road To Dublin.

Personal life
He has been married to Mary Weldon since 1982. They have four sons; Domhnall, Fergus, Brían, and Rory. Domhnall and Brían are also actors. Gleeson speaks fluent Irish and is an advocate of the promotion of the Irish language. Gleeson is a fan of English football club Aston Villa, as is his son Domhnall.

Filmography

Film

Television

Theatre

Awards and nominations

References

External links

1955 births
Living people
20th-century Irish male actors
21st-century Irish male actors
Cartoon Saloon people
Dublin fiddlers
Gleeson family
Irish expatriates in the United States
Irish fiddlers
Irish folk musicians
Irish male film actors
Irish male stage actors
Irish male television actors
Jacob's Award winners
Male actors from Dublin (city)
Musicians from County Dublin
Outstanding Performance by a Lead Actor in a Miniseries or Movie Primetime Emmy Award winners
People from Artane, Dublin
People from Howth